The Extreme Right in Europe and the USA (1992; second edition 1994) is a book edited by Paul Hainsworth. It is a political science study of far-right politics in Western Europe with a chapter on the United States, and one on Eastern European developments and collects work by twelve authors. Fritz Stern, writing for Foreign Affairs, described it as "uneven". A follow-up, The Extreme Right in Europe and the United States: From the Margins to the Mainstream, was published in 2000.

References 

1992 non-fiction books
Books about the far right